Smethwick was a parliamentary constituency, centred on the town of Smethwick in Staffordshire. It returned one Member of Parliament (MP) to the House of Commons of the Parliament of the United Kingdom, elected by the first past the post voting system. The constituency was created for the 1918 general election, and abolished for the February 1974 general election.

The constituency gained national interest during the 1918 general election when the Suffragette leader Christabel Pankhurst decided to stand as a Woman's Party candidate supporting the Coalition. She was one of 17 women candidates standing for Parliament at the first opportunity. This was her one and only parliamentary campaign which she lost to the Labour candidate.

In 1945 the constituency held the first post-war by-election when the winning Labour candidate, Alfred Dobbs, was killed in a road traffic accident less than twenty four hours after the count. The constituency was the subject of national media coverage during the 1964 general election when Peter Griffiths, the Conservative Party candidate, gained the seat against the national trend, unseating the Labour Party sitting member, Patrick Gordon Walker, a front bench opposition spokesman in the previous Parliament, in a campaign with racial overtones.

Boundaries 
The County Borough of Smethwick.

Members of Parliament

Elections

Elections in the 1910s

Elections in the 1920s

Elections in the 1930s

Elections in the 1940s

Elections in the 1950s

Elections in the 1960s

Elections in the 1970s

See also 
 List of former United Kingdom Parliament constituencies
 Smethwick (the town)
 1926 Smethwick by-election
 1945 Smethwick by-election
 Smethwick in the 1964 general election

References 

 

Politics of Sandwell
Parliamentary constituencies in the West Midlands (county) (historic)
Parliamentary constituencies in Staffordshire (historic)
Constituencies of the Parliament of the United Kingdom established in 1918
Constituencies of the Parliament of the United Kingdom disestablished in 1974
Smethwick